William Strang (16 September 1878 – 7 October 1916) was a Scottish professional footballer who played in the Scottish League for Celtic as a full back. He was described as a "robust full back with a lusty kick."

Personal life 
Strang emigrated with his family to Calgary, Canada in 1905 and worked as a printer. On 21 August 1915, a year after the outbreak of the First World War, Strang enlisted as a private in the 56th Battalion of the Canadian Expeditionary Force, falsifying his age to appear two years younger. He landed with the 31st Battalion in France in July 1916 and was promoted to the rank of acting lance corporal on 22 September 1916, while he was serving on the Somme. Strang was wounded in the head shortly after his promotion and died of wounds in Rouen on 7 October 1916. He was buried in St Sever Cemetery, Rouen.

Career statistics

References 

Scottish footballers
1916 deaths
Canadian military personnel killed in World War I
1878 births
Scottish Football League players
Celtic F.C. players
Footballers from Dunfermline
Canadian Expeditionary Force soldiers
Association football fullbacks
Renton F.C. players
Calgary Callies players
Scottish military personnel
Scottish expatriate sportspeople in Canada
Scottish expatriate footballers
Expatriate soccer players in Canada